Getit is a defunct directional media company in India. Its services included E-wallet, E-commerce, Grocery, Local search, yellow pages, white pages directories, classified media, tele-information services. It operated in 56 cities pan India. The logo of Ask me was designed by Joel James. Getit offered services such as print, voice, online and mobile platforms. Investors in the company included Malaysia based Astro All Asia Networks plc and Helion Venture Partners. The company is engaged in a battle with its shareholders and debtors. There are cases in NCLT involving disputes among minority shareholders: Sanjeev Gupta (ex-MD & family) and Astro Entertainment Network Ltd. Sanjeev Gupta has been accused of not paying the salaries to the employees & dues to the debtors and sellers.

History
Getit Infoservices Private Ltd., formerly known as Getit Infomediary Ltd. /M&N Publications Ltd., introduced http://www.yellowpages.co.in in India under the brand name Getit Yellow Pages.

 In 2002, Getit introduced segmented yellow pages for Business-to-business Industrial users and B2C residential/official consumers.
 In 2012, Getit launched its Wireless Application Protocol(WAP) search for mobiles on m.getit.in.
 In 2013 Astro's Getit buys Infomedia yellow pages & Askme
 AskMe
 AskMeBazaar
 AskMeFurniture (Mebelkart.com)
 AskMeGrocery
 AskmePay
 Askme.com acquires online grocery market place Bestatlowest.com.
The site was closed in 2017.

References

External links
  Local search website
  E-commerce website
  MeetUniversity
  E-Wallet website
  Furniture E-commerce website

Online retailers of India
Privately held companies of India
Yellow pages